Mavarem Kola (also Romanized as Mavārem Kolā) is a village in Nowkand Kola Rural District, in the Central District of Qaem Shahr County, Mazandaran Province, Iran. At the 2006 census, its population was 306, in 86 families.

References 

Populated places in Qaem Shahr County